Tanner James Kero (born July 24, 1992) is an American professional ice hockey player for the Texas Stars of the American Hockey League (AHL) while under contract to the Dallas Stars of the National Hockey League (NHL).

Playing career

Amateur
Prior to his collegiate hockey career, Kero played for the Marquette Rangers in the NAHL where he led the league in goals (with 32) and was named the league's "Rookie of the Year". He also played for the Fargo Force in the USHL where he posted 13 goals, 24 assists and 37 points in 55 games and earned a spot on the USHL Western Conference All-Star Team.

Prior to turning professional, Kero attended Michigan Technological University where he played four seasons of NCAA Division I hockey with the Michigan Tech Huskies, where he registered 55 goals, 56 assists, 111 points, and 67 penalty minutes in 153 games. In his senior year, Kero's outstanding play was recognized with numerous awards including being selected as the 2014–15 WCHA Player of the Year and being named to the 2014–15 NCAA (West) First All-American Team.

Professional
On April 2, 2015, the Chicago Blackhawks of the National Hockey League (NHL) signed Kero to a two-year entry-level contract. He began the 2015–16 season assigned to AHL affiliate, the Rockford IceHogs. On October 27, 2015, the Blackhawks recalled him to the NHL.

He made his NHL debut on October 29, 2015, in a 3–1 loss to the Winnipeg Jets. Just 4 games later, he scored his first NHL goal on November 6, shooting past Cory Schneider, in a 4–2 loss against the New Jersey Devils. On March 23, 2017, the Blackhawks signed Kero to a two-year contract extension.

On June 24, 2018, Kero was traded to the Vancouver Canucks in exchange for Michael Chaput.

On July 1, 2019, having left the Canucks as a free agent, Kero was signed to a two-year, two-way contract with the Dallas Stars on July 1, 2019.

Personal life
Kero was born in Southfield, Michigan and is the son of Dale and Joan Kero. He has five sisters (one of them, Jordanna played for the Michigan Tech volleyball team) and four brothers; three of them: Dawson, Devin and Hunter play hockey as well. While attending Michigan Tech, Kero had a grade point average of 3.68 in mathematics.

Career statistics

Awards and honors

References

External links

1992 births
Living people
American men's ice hockey centers
Chicago Blackhawks players
Dallas Stars players
Fargo Force players
Ice hockey players from Michigan
Michigan Tech Huskies men's ice hockey players
Rockford IceHogs (AHL) players
Texas Stars players
Undrafted National Hockey League players
Utica Comets players
AHCA Division I men's ice hockey All-Americans